Central Pattana Public Company Limited  is Thailand's largest retail property development and investment company. It is a business unit under its parent, the Central Group. Central Pattana was founded as Central Plaza Co., Ltd. on 17 June 1980 with registered capital of 300 million baht by Central Group, the Tejapaibul family, Saha Union Group, and minor shareholders. The company was registered as a public limited company in 1994 and was listed on the Stock Exchange of Thailand (SET) on 1 March 1995. Ms. Wallaya Chirathivat is president and CEO.

Properties 
Central Pattana currently operates 36 shopping centers, with a total leasable area of 1.9 million m2 (15 projects in Bangkok and perimeter, 20 projects in provincial Thailand and 1 project in Malaysia), a super-regional mall under a joint-venture and 18 community malls. In addition, the company operates 32 food courts, 10 office buildings, 2 hotels, 22 residential projects.

Central Village, the first luxury outlet in Thailand, opened on August 31, 2019 and is located near Suvarnabhumi Airport and is 30-45 minutes from Bangkok CBD. It is a joint venture between Central Pattana Plc. and Mitsubishi Estate (Thailand) Co. Ltd., a subsidiary of global real estate Mitsubishi Estate Co. Ltd.

Central i-City, in Shah Alam, Selangor, Malaysia, is Central Pattana’s first overseas full-scaled Thai shopping center in Malaysia. This underscores Central Pattana as a leader by creating a ‘New Shopping Experience’ and a ‘Center of Life’ in the ASEAN region. This is a joint-venture project between Central Pattana and i-Berhad (the owner of i-City project). The project is located within i-City Ultrapolis, a grand lifestyle hub in Shah Alam.

Retail-Led Mixed-Used Development 

All elements of Central Pattana, including shopping centers, residential projects, office buildings and hotels, will join forces to deliver a seamless experience. In the next five years or in 2022-2026, the company will have 50 shopping centers in Thailand and overseas, 16 community malls (under the feasibility study), 68 residential projects, 13 office buildings, and 37 hotels, spanning across over 30 provinces and overseas. More than half of these are parts of mixed-use development projects, of which the shopping centers will be the key component while consistently expanding other businesses, as well.

Business Direction 

Central Pattana's business direction for 2022 is to continue opening new projects as planned, including Central Chanthaburi, which is scheduled to open in the second quarter of the year, and Central WestVille, which is scheduled to open in the fourth quarter of 2023. The enhancement projects for centralwOrld, Central Rama 2, and Central Ramintra to name a few, and expansion into mixed-use development projects, such as offices, hotels and residential development. In addition, Dusit Central Park, which is a co-development project between Central Pattana and Dusit Thani plc, will gradually welcome customers from 2023-2024 onwards.

Gallery

References

External links
 
 
 
 

 
Central Group
Real estate companies established in 1980
Retail companies established in 1980
Companies listed on the Stock Exchange of Thailand
1980 establishments in Thailand